Mu Odia is a 24×7 Odia music channel which is broadcast from Bhubaneswar. MBC TV M/s Micro broadcast (MBC) has planned for “Mu Odia” to separate Entertainment contents from its existing TV channel.

See also
List of Odia-language television channels

Music television channels in India
Television stations in Bhubaneswar
Odia-language television channels
Year of establishment missing
Television channels and stations established in 2016